Kanebogen Church is a parish church of the Church of Norway in Harstad Municipality in Troms og Finnmark county, Norway. It is located in the Kanebogen area of the town of Harstad on the island of Hinnøya. It is the church for the Kanebogen parish which is part of the Trondenes prosti (deanery) in the Diocese of Nord-Hålogaland. The white, wood and concrete church was built in a rectangular style in 1999 using plans drawn up by the architects Ivar Tolo and Jim Myrstad. The church seats about 400 people.

History
The church was built to replace the old Fredly Chapel that burned down on this site in 1984. After many years of planning, authorization for the new church was given and it was to be upgraded to a full parish church, rather than the chapel status of its predecessor. The congregation met in a rented room in a shopping centre while funds for the new church were raised. The church was completed in 1999, and as such it was the last new church building completed in Norway prior to the turn of the new millennium. The church was consecrated on 19 December 1999 by the Bishop Ola Steinholt.

Media gallery

See also
List of churches in Nord-Hålogaland

References

Harstad
Churches in Troms
20th-century Church of Norway church buildings
Churches completed in 1999
1999 establishments in Norway
Concrete churches in Norway
Rectangular churches in Norway